The 160th Massachusetts General Court, consisting of the Massachusetts Senate and the Massachusetts House of Representatives, met in 1957 and 1958 during the governorship of Foster Furcolo. Newland H. Holmes served as president of the Senate and John F. Thompson served as speaker of the House.

Senators

Representatives

See also
 85th United States Congress
 List of Massachusetts General Courts

References

Further reading
 
  ("Please support Senate Bill 280 to place Walden Pond State Reservation under control of the Department of Natural Resources...")

External links
 
 
 
 

Political history of Massachusetts
Massachusetts legislative sessions
massachusetts
1957 in Massachusetts
massachusetts
1958 in Massachusetts